Baochang may refer to:

Towns
 Baochang, Taibus Banner (宝昌镇), Inner Mongolia
 Baochang, Haimen (包场镇), in Haimen City, Jiangsu

People
Baochang (monk) (466–518? CE), Buddhist monk of Wu